Susan Baker (born 1955) is an Irish environmental scientist and professor.

Susan Baker may refer to:

Susan Baker (virologist), American molecular virologist and professor
Susan Pardee Baker (born 1930), American professor of health policy and management